Julie Page (born 21 April 1983) is a basketball player for Great Britain women's national basketball team. She is   weighs 85 kg and was part of the squad for the 2012 Summer Olympics.

References

1983 births
Living people
British women's basketball players
Basketball players at the 2012 Summer Olympics
Olympic basketball players of Great Britain